Waiomu is a settlement on the west coast of the Coromandel Peninsula of New Zealand, between Tapu to the north and Te Puru to the south.  runs through it. 

Waiomu Kauri Grove Walk is a hiking trail to a stand of New Zealand kauri trees in Coromandel Forest Park.

Demographics
Waiomu is described by Statistics New Zealand as a rural settlement. Waiomu is part of the larger Thames Coast statistical area.

Waiomu had a population of 354 at the 2018 New Zealand census, an increase of 15 people (4.4%) since the 2013 census, and a decrease of 30 people (−7.8%) since the 2006 census. There were 144 households, comprising 171 males and 186 females, giving a sex ratio of 0.92 males per female, with 39 people (11.0%) aged under 15 years, 33 (9.3%) aged 15 to 29, 156 (44.1%) aged 30 to 64, and 123 (34.7%) aged 65 or older.

Ethnicities were 79.7% European/Pākehā, 28.8% Māori, 2.5% Pacific peoples, 0.8% Asian, and 1.7% other ethnicities. People may identify with more than one ethnicity.

Although some people chose not to answer the census's question about religious affiliation, 52.5% had no religion, 34.7% were Christian and 0.8% had other religions.

Of those at least 15 years old, 33 (10.5%) people had a bachelor's or higher degree, and 84 (26.7%) people had no formal qualifications. 24 people (7.6%) earned over $70,000 compared to 17.2% nationally. The employment status of those at least 15 was that 93 (29.5%) people were employed full-time, 48 (15.2%) were part-time, and 9 (2.9%) were unemployed.

References

Thames-Coromandel District
Populated places in Waikato
Beaches of Waikato